The Heinkel HD 36 was a trainer developed in Germany in the 1920s at the request of the Swedish Air Force, which was in search of a new trainer aircraft. The newly formed air force had previously evaluated the HD 35, found it to be underpowered, and asked Heinkel to address this problem. Heinkel's response was a development of the HD 35 modified to use the Mercedes D.III engine instead. The HD 36 also dispensed with the third cockpit that had been a feature of the HD 35 and HD 21 before it, but otherwise the design was largely the same. The single example built by Heinkel was tested by the Air Force, and found still not quite satisfactory, was modified by CFM (the Air Force workshops) until the problems had been largely eliminated. Once this had happened, CFM built two batches of 10 aircraft, delivering them in 1928 and 1930 as the Sk 6.

Constant trouble with the engines led to restrictions on longer flights being imposed, and the solution eventually adopted was to replace the engines on all Sk 6s with Armstrong Siddeley Pumas. Aircraft thus modified were redesignated S 6A. Regardless, the type did not remain in service for very long, and all were dismantled after only a few years.

Operators

Swedish Air Force

Specifications

References
 

1920s German military trainer aircraft
HD 36
Aircraft first flown in 1927